is a school for the blind located in Fukui, Fukui Prefecture, Japan. The school educates children in regular school subjects as well as basic life skills from kindergarten through high school. The school was founded on June 10, 1913.

Location
The school can be accessed by taking a 15-minute ride on a Keifuku Bus from Fukui Station (on JR-West's Hokuriku Main Line) to the  bus stop. You can also access it via a 15-minute walk from the Oiwakeguchi Station on the Echizen Railway Katsuyama Eiheiji Line.

Contact information
The school is located at the following address: 39-8 Harame-chō, Fukui-shi, Fukui-ken 〒910−0825

External links
 Fukui Prefectural School for the Visually Impaired

Educational institutions established in 1913
1913 establishments in Japan
Fukui (city)
Schools in Fukui Prefecture
Schools for the blind in Japan